Abel Santamaria also known as Constancia and is a ward (consejo popular) and a town in Encrucijada, Villa Clara Province, Cuba. It’s the birthplace of Abel Santamaría, a Cuban revolutionary that fought for the 26th of July Movement and his sister Haydée Santamaría.

Geography
Towns in Abel Santamaría’s ward are: 
 Canoa
 Tuinicú
 Paso Real
 Raizúa
 Castaño
 Las Mercedes
 Progreso
 Cayo Hueso
 Guadalupe
 Congojas

Abel Santamaria is south of La Sierra and El Purio. It's north of Santa Clara Municipality. To the east is the Sagua la Chica River and its west is Encrucijada Sur.

Education
Schools in Constancia include:
 Boris Luis Santa Coloma Primary School
 CI Sueños de Abel
 Mariana Grajales Rural Primary School
 Augusto César Sandino Rural Primary School
 Roberto Rodríguez Rural Primary School
 Jesús Menéndez Rural Primary School
 Marcelo Salado Rural Primary School

Arts

Landmarks
In Abel Santamaria there are monuments including:
 a Spanish Fort
 Bust of

References 

Cities in Cuba
Populated places in Villa Clara Province
1867 establishments in North America
Populated places established in 1867
1867 establishments in the Spanish Empire